Penllyn station is a station situated in the village of Penllyn, Lower Gwynedd Township, Montgomery County, Pennsylvania, United States. It is served by the SEPTA Lansdale/Doylestown Line. The station, located at the intersection of Old Penllyn Pike and Pen-Ambler Road, includes a 55-space parking lot and also provides a connection to SEPTA Bus Route 94.  

Penllyn station was built in 1930 by the Reading Railroad. In the mid-1990s, the building served as the headquarters of fast-growing online music retailer CDNow. In FY 2013, the station had a weekday average of 216 boardings and 182 alightings.

Station layout
Penllyn has two low-level side platforms.

References

External links
SEPTA - Penllyn Station
 Penllyn Pike entrance from Google Maps Street View
 Station from Old Penllyn Pike from Google Maps Street View

SEPTA Regional Rail stations
Railway stations in the United States opened in 1930
Railway stations in Montgomery County, Pennsylvania
Stations on the SEPTA Main Line